The Nordfriedhof ("Northern Cemetery"), with 34,000 burial plots, is one of the largest cemeteries in Munich, Bavaria, Germany. It is situated in the suburb of Schwabing-Freimann. It was established by the former community of Schwabing in 1884. It is not to be confused with the Alter Nordfriedhof in Munich, which was set up only a short time previously within the then territory of the city of Munich.

A station on the Munich U-Bahn is also called Nordfriedhof after the cemetery, and the surrounding area is also known locally as "Nordfriedhof" from the station.

The imposing cemetery buildings include a chapel, a mortuary and a burial wall, which was designed between 1896 and 1899 by the municipal architect Hans Grässel. In 1962 a columbarium was added to the north by the architect Eugen Jacoby.

The chapel is described, slightly altered, in Thomas Mann's novella Death in Venice, when the sight of it precipitates a foreboding of death in the protagonist.

Selected burials
 Peter Paul Althaus, poet of Schwabing
 Herb Andress, actor
 Annette von Aretin, first female announcer of Bayerischer Rundfunk
 August Arnold, film producer and director
 Karl Arnold, caricaturist in the journal Simplicissimus
 Philip Arp, actor, cabaret performer, author and theatre director
 Gert Bastian, brigadier-general, symbolic figure of the peace movement
 Fritz Benscher, actor and quiz master
 Otto Bezold, politician
 Franziska Bilek, caricaturist and artist
 Louis Braun, professor and historical painter
 Beppo Brem, folk actor
 Georg Britting, writer
 Christine Buchegger, actress
 Franz von Defregger, artist
 Hans Dölle, legal academic
 Sammy Drechsel, sports reporter and cabaret performer, and his wife Irene Koss, actress and the first television announcer in Germany
 Constanze Engelbrecht, actress
 Oskar Eversbusch, professor of ophthalmology
 Theodore Feucht, painter
 Josef Flossmann, sculptor
 Leonhard Frank, writer
 Hermann Frieb, resistance fighter against the Nazi regime
 Marie Amelie von Godin, writer, supporter of women's rights and Albanologist
 Günter Freiherr von Gravenreuth, lawyer
 Klaus Havenstein, cabaret performer and actor
 Johannes Heesters, actor and singer
 Trude Hesterberg (Schönherr), cabaret performer
 Heinrich Hoffmann, Hitler's official photographer, with his daughter Henriette von Schirach
 Kurt Horwitz, actor, director at the Munich Kammerspiele, director of the Bayerisches Staatsschauspiel
 Peter Igelhoff, musician, composer of pop music and jazz
 Günther Kaufmann, actor
 Eduard von Keyserling, writer (grave 25-4-1)
 Kathi Kobus, landlady of the Alter Simpl
 Wolfgang Koeppen, writer
 Oskar Körner, killed during the Munich Putsch, Second Chairman of the NSDAP
 Otto Kurth, actor and director 
 Inge Latz, composer and musical healer
 Hermann Lenz, writer
 Ernst Mach, physicist and philosopher
 Ferdinand Marian, actor (grave now removed)
 Georg Marischka, actor and director
 Anton Neuhäusler, Bavarian dialect poet
 Peter Pasetti, actor
 Ludwig Petuel senior and junior, industrialists
 Toni Pfülf, SPD politician
 Bally Prell, performance artist
 Sebastian Osterrieder, sculptor, Krippenwastl
 Theodor von der Pfordten, killed during the Munich Putsch (in family grave) 
 Hans Pössenbacher, actor 
 Mady Rahl, actress (grave 178-U-66)
 Anton Riemerschmid, founder of the first German business school for girls
 Barbara Rudnik, actress
 Wilhelm von Rümann, sculptor, formerly in the Alten Vereins-Urnenhalle (urn now secured)
 Beatrix, Countess of Schönburg-Glauchau, socialite
 Arnulf Schröder, actor
 Carl-Heinz Schroth, actor
 Oswald Spengler, political philosopher
 Heinz-Günter Stamm, actor, radio and theatre director
 Fedor Stepun, philosopher and sociologist
 Karlheinz Summerer, Roman Catholic chaplain for the Munich Olympics, 1972
 Siegbert Tarrasch, chess player, theoretician and writer
 Paul Troost, architect
 Kurt Weinzierl, actor, cabaret performer and director
 Frederic Vester, biochemist, environmental expert and writer
 Albert Weisgerber, painter
 Annemarie Wendl, actress
 Otto Wernicke, actor (grave now removed)
 Josef Wittmann, church painter
 Karoline Wittmann, painter
 Paul Wittmann, sculptor
 Eduard Zimmermann, journalist and television presenter
 Traudl Junge, secretary to Adolf Hitler, 1942-1945
 A mass grave for 2,099 victims of aerial bombardment during World War II has been converted to form a "grove of honour for air raid victims" (Ehrenhain für Luftkriegsopfer), with a monument by Hans Wimmer.

Sources
 Gretzschel, M., 1996: Historische Friedhöfe in Deutschland, Österreich und der Schweiz. Das Reiselexikon. Munich: Callwey 
 Scheibmayr, E., 1985: Letzte Heimat. Persönlichkeiten in Münchner Friedhöfen 1784–1984 (1st edition). Munich: Edition Scheibmayr Continued by:Wer? Wann? Wo? Persönlichkeiten in Münchner Friedhöfen. (Teil 1/3, Ergänzung zum Grundwerk und Fortschreibung bis 1989). Munich: Edition Scheibmayr 1989  Wer? Wann? Wo? Persönlichkeiten in Münchner Friedhöfen. (Teil 2/3, Ergänzung zum Grundwerk und Fortschreibung bis 1996). Munich: Edition Scheibmayr 1997 Wer? Wann? Wo? Persönlichkeiten in Münchner Friedhöfen. (Teil 3/3, Ergänzung zum Grundwerk und Fortschreibung bis 2002). Munich: Edition Scheibmayr 2002

Notes and references

External links

 Nordfriedhof on the website of the City of Munich 
 Friedhof.stadt-muenchen.net: graves of well-known people at the Nordfriedhof 
 Graves of those associated with the Nazi era at Nordfriedhof 

Cemeteries in Munich
Parks and open spaces in Munich